Anita Somani is an American physician and politician who is a representative in the Ohio House of Representatives for the 11th district. Elected in November 2022, she assumed office on January 1, 2023.

Education 
Somani earned a Bachelor of Arts degree in psychology from Miami University and a Doctor of Medicine from the Medical College of Ohio.

Career 
From 1994 to 2020, Somani was an OBGYN at and owner of Comprehensive Women's Care. In 2020, she joined OhioHealth as a gynecologist. Somani was elected to the Ohio House of Representatives in November 2022.

References 

Living people
Physicians from Ohio
American gynecologists
Miami University alumni
Women state legislators in Ohio
Members of the Ohio House of Representatives
Year of birth missing (living people)